Bedford Racecourse was a former horse racing venue in Bedford, England.

In 1811, it held the first steeplechase over manufactured fences in front of a crowd of 40,000 spectators. A horse called Fugitive won, beating a horse called Cecilia over a three-mile course in which four 4ft 6in fences were each jumped twice.

It was hosting two annual meetings by 1840.

References

Bibliography

Defunct horse racing venues in England
Sport in Bedfordshire